Berezovka is a rural locality (a selo) in Alginsky Selsoviet, Davlekanovsky District, Bashkortostan, Russia. The population was 145 as of 2010. There are 3 streets.

Geography 
Berezovka is located 24 km northwest of Davlekanovo (the district's administrative centre) by road. Voroshilovo is the nearest rural locality.

References 

Rural localities in Davlekanovsky District